Henry Bigger Nicholson (September 5, 1925 – March 2, 2007) who published under the name H.B. Nicholson, was a scholar of the Aztecs. His major scholarly monograph is Topiltzin Quetzalcoatl: The Once and Future Lord of the Toltecs (2001).

Nicholson died of a heart attack on March 2, 2007.

Publications

Monograph
Topiltzin Quetzalcoatl: The Once and Future Lord of the Toltecs Boulder: University Press of Colorado 2001

Articles and encyclopedia entries

Two Aztec Wood Idols: Iconographic and Chronologic Analysis (with Rainer Berger; 1968)
 "Religion in Pre-Hispanic Central Mexico" In Handbook of Middle American Indians, vol. 10, 395–446, Eds. G. F. Ekholm and Ignacio Bernal, Austin, University oí Texas Press.
 "Eduard Georg Seler, 1849-1922," Handbook of Middle American Indians(HMAI) Guide to Ethnohistorical Sources, Vol. 13 Part 2. (1973) pp. 348-369.
"Sahagún’s Primeros Memoriales, Tepepulco", HMAI vol. 13 pp. 207-217.
 "Middle American Ethnohistory: An Overview," HMAI, vol. 15 pp. 487-505.
Origins of Religious Art & Iconography in Preclassic Mesoamerica (as editor; 1976)
Pre-Columbian Art from the Land Collection (with Alana Cordy-Collins; 1979)
Art of Aztec Mexico: Treasures of Tenochtitlan (with Eloise Quiñones Keber; 1983)
Mixteca-Puebla: Discoveries and Research in Mesoamerican Art and Archaeology (edited with Eloise Quiñones Keber; 1994)
 "Borgia Group of Pictorial Manuscripts" in Oxford Encyclopedia of Mesoamerican Cultures (OEMC), New York: Oxford University Press 2001, vol. 1, pp. 98-101.
 "Feathered Serpent" OEMC, vol. 1, pp. 397-400.
 "Mixteca-Puebla Style" OEMC, vol. 2, pp. 329-330.
 "Bernardino de Sahagún" OEMC, vol. 3, pp.105-113.
 "Eduard Seler" OEMC, vol. 3, pp. 134-37.
 "Topiltzin Quetzalcoatl" OEMC vol. 3, 246–247.

Notes

References
 
 
 
 

1925 births
2007 deaths
University of California, Los Angeles faculty
American Mesoamericanists
Historians of Mesoamerica
Historians of Mesoamerican art
Aztec scholars
20th-century Mesoamericanists